Sylvester Adam Simon (December 14, 1897 – February 28, 1973) was a professional baseball player for the St. Louis Browns in 1923 and 1924. He was an infielder, playing at both shortstop and third base. For his career he hit for a .242 batting average.

References 

Major League Baseball third basemen
Major League Baseball shortstops
St. Louis Browns players
Baseball players from Indiana
1897 births
1973 deaths
Nashville Vols players